Loewia glutinosa is a species of shrub from East Kenya belonging to the family Passifloraceae., Ethopia, and Somalia. 

L. glutinosa can grow up to 3 meters and has orange flowers. Flowers can be distylous or homostylous. Leaf size and shape varies across regions. Colloquially it is called rumassan (Somali).

References 

Passifloraceae
Plants described in 1896
Taxa named by Ignatz Urban